The Rock Rapids Browns were a minor league baseball team based in Rock Rapids, Iowa. The Rock Rapids Browns played the 1902 season as members of the Class D level Iowa-South Dakota League. The Rock Rapids Browns were the only minor league team hosted in Rock Rapids to date.

History
Minor league baseball began in Rock Rapids, Iowa in 1902. The Rock Rapids Browns became charter members of the six–team Iowa-South Dakota League in 1902. Rock Rapids joined the Flandreau Indians, Le Mars Blackbirds, Sheldon, Sioux City Cornhuskers and Sioux Falls Canaries as charter members.

The Rock Rapids Browns placed fifth in the 1902 Iowa–South Dakota League standings. The Browns enede the with a record of 32–59, finishing 34.0 games behind the first place Sioux Falls Canaries, as the league held no playoffs. The Browns, playing under manager "Grandpa" Greene, finished behind the Sioux City Cornhuskers, Flandreau Indians and Le Mars Blackbirds and ahead of 6th place Sheldon teams.

After a home game in Rock Rapids, it was reported that fans rushed the field, angry at an umpire. It was also reported that after the Browns started poorly, a meeting was held in Rock Rapids and fans were sent out to the Iowa cities of Des Moines, Algona, Sioux City and Flandreau to scout for better players.

Reports indicated that by mid–August pitcher Ralph Thomas had been suspended from the team for drunkenness and Joe Snooks for drunkenness and insulting a "respectable married lady of Rock Rapids."

Placing fifth in the 1902 league standings, Rock Rapids finished behind the champion Sioux Falls Canaries (65–24), Sioux City Cornhuskers (56–40) Flandreau Indians (51–19), Le Mars Blackbirds (43–48) and ahead of Sheldon (14–71).

The Rock Rapids Browns permanently folded after the 1902 season. A meeting was held to discuss the franchise returning to play in 1903. The Iowa–South Dakota League played their last season in 1903 as a four–team league before folding.

The ballpark
The name of the minor league ballpark for the Rock Rapids Browns is not directly referenced. The site of today's Borman Forster Fields was in use during the era. The location of the 21 acre park is 1400 South 3rd Avenue, Rock Rapids, Iowa.

Timeline

Year-by-year record

Notable alumni
Babe Towne (1902)

See also
Rock Rapids Browns players

References

Defunct minor league baseball teams
Professional baseball teams in Iowa
Defunct baseball teams in Iowa
Baseball teams established in 1902
Baseball teams disestablished in 1902
Lyon County, Iowa
Iowa-South Dakota League teams